The KCR 556 is a service rifle which was developed for the Turkish Armed Forces by Kale Kalıp It fires 5.56x45 mm NATO ammunition. The modular gun is an advanced gas-operated rifle with rotating bolt head and piston op-rod driven fixed gas system. It is suitable for ambidextrous use. It has a maintenance free gas system up to 10,000 rounds which minimises fouling and heat. The chrome plated cold hammer forged barrel is free floating. The gun is quite ergonomic with its modular flipup iron sight and five-position telescopic adjustable stock. The gun's length is  when the stock is extended. The gun weights  excluding the magazine.

Users 

 Gendarmerie General Command
Gendarmerie Special Public Security Command
Gendarmerie Special Operations
 Coast Guard Command (Turkey)

 Security Forces Command

References

External links

5.56 mm assault rifles
Rifles of Turkey
Firearms of Turkey
5.56×45mm NATO assault rifles
Police weapons
Designated marksman rifles